Clackmannan Tower is a five-storey tower house, situated at the summit of King's Seat Hill in Clackmannan, Clackmannanshire, Scotland.  It dates back to at least the 14th century, when it was inhabited by King David II of Scotland, and David is recorded as selling it to his cousin Robert Bruce in 1359.

It is a designated scheduled ancient monument.

Description
Clackmannan Tower is located on King's Seat Hill, on the western edge of the town of Clackmannan in the Scottish county of Clackmannanshire. The tower is largely still intact from its medieval days, including the roof, although part of the eastern wall was reconstructed following a collapse in 1950. The building is L-shaped, with five storeys. The original part of the building is on the north, and the slightly higher 1500s wing to the south, using cut blocks of pink sandstone. The newer section features a fireplace on the second floor, typical of its period. Gardens and an area probably once used as a bowling green are situated to the south of the tower, while a large platform is on the northern side.

History
The land on which the tower stands was the originally the property of the Crown of Scotland, and in the late 12th century the town of Clackmannan was home to a mill belonging to the monks of the Cambuskenneth Abbey. It is not known exactly when the original tower was constructed, and local tradition asserts that it was built by Robert the Bruce. By September 1314, the castle was King Robert's residence, within easy reach of Stirling. King David II Bruce was recorded as being in residence at the town in 1329, and the tower may have been constructed by then. In 1359, David sold the site, including a hunting lodge, to his cousin Sir Robert Bruce, possibly with a view to keeping it in the possession of the Bruce family and not as a royal asset.

In around 1500 the south wing was added, and in the seventeenth century a moat and drawbridge were built as well as surrounding walls.

The tower remained the property of the Bruce family until 1796.

References

External links 

Clackmannan Tower

Castles in Clackmannanshire
Scheduled Ancient Monuments in Clackmannanshire
Tower houses in Scotland